Symphlebia geertsi is a moth in the family Erebidae first described by Gustaaf Hulstaert in 1924. It is found in Brazil.

References

geertsi
Moths described in 1924